The Samsung Galaxy S5 is an Android-based smartphone unveiled, produced, released and marketed by Samsung Electronics as part of the Samsung Galaxy S series. Unveiled on 24 February 2014 at Mobile World Congress in Barcelona, Spain, it was released on 11 April 2014 in 150 countries as the immediate successor to the Galaxy S4. As with the S4, the S5 is an evolution of the prior year's model, placing a particular emphasis on an improved build with a textured rear cover and IP67 certification for dust and water resistance, a more refined user experience, new security features such as a fingerprint reader and private mode, expanded health-related features including a built-in heart rate monitor, a USB 3.0 port, and an updated camera featuring speedy auto-focus through phase-detection as well as video resolution upgraded to 2160p (4K) and framerate at 1080p doubled.

The Galaxy S5 received mostly positive reviews; the phone was praised for its display, hardware, camera, long battery life, and incorporating water resistance while retaining a removable battery and MicroSD card slot, making it the final in its series with the former. However, the S5 was criticized for bloated software, its unresponsive fingerprint scanner, and its ostensibly non-"premium" polycarbonate in light of rival smartphones' metal or glass bodies.

In August 2015, following the release of its then-latest flagship, the Galaxy S6, Samsung released an updated version called the "Galaxy S5 Neo" which has an Exynos 7 Octa (7580) processor clocked at 1.6 GHz. It has 2 GB of RAM, 16 GB of internal storage, USB 2.0 port, comes with Android 5.0.2 "Lollipop", and lacks fingerprint unlocking and 4K (2160p) video recording.

Release date 
The Galaxy S5 was unveiled on 24 February 2014 as part of the company's presentation at Mobile World Congress in Barcelona, Spain. Samsung Electronics president JK Shin explained that consumers did not want a phone dependent on "eye-popping" or "complex" technology, but one with "beautiful design and performance", a "simple, yet powerful camera", "faster and seamless connectivity", and fitness-oriented features.

Samsung announced that it would release the S5 on 11 April 2014 in 150 countries—including the United Kingdom and United States. On 18 June 2014, Samsung unveiled an LTE-Advanced version of the S5, exclusively released in South Korea. Unlike other models, the LTE-A version also upgrades the display to a quad HD, 1440p panel.

Shortly after the release of the S5, it was discovered that some Samsung Galaxy S5 devices—particularly those on Verizon Wireless—were suffering from a major bug that caused the device's camera hardware to permanently cease functioning, and display a "Camera failed" error on-screen whenever users attempt to use the camera. Both Samsung and Verizon confirmed the issue, which affected a limited number of Galaxy S5 devices; Samsung instructed users affected by the bug to contact the company or their carrier to have their phone replaced under warranty.

Specifications

Hardware and design

Changes 

The design of the S5 evolves upon the design of the S4. It features a rounded, polycarbonate chassis carrying a "modern glam" look with a dot pattern similarly to that on the 2012 Google Nexus 7 tablet computer, faux metal trim and a removable rear cover. Unlike past models, the S5's rear cover uses a higher quality soft plastic and is dimpled to improve grip.

The S5 is IP67 certified for dust and water resistance. The S5's Micro-USB 3.0 port uses a removable cover. The S5 is available in Charcoal Black, Electric Blue, Copper Gold, and Shimmery White color finishes. The S5's screen is a  1080p Super AMOLED panel, which is slightly larger than that of the S4, and allows for automatic brightness and gamut adjustments. Its minimum dimmable brightness level has been lowered to facilitate vision in dark environments without the need for third-party screen filter overlay apps which would interfere with screen captures.

Front panel 
Below the screen are three buttons. The physical "Home" button in the centre contains a swipe-based fingerprint scanner. There is a "Recent apps" key (also known as "task key") on the left side and a "Back" key on the right side of the home button. As with all main models from the Galaxy S series, the navigation buttons left and right to the home buttons are capacitive. However, in accordance with Android 4.0 human interface guidelines, the S5 no longer uses a "Menu" key like its predecessors (left side of home button), although its button layout is still reversed in comparison to other Android devices with the S5's button layout (such as the HTC One X and Galaxy Nexus, whose "Back" buttons are to the left of "Home"). However, holding the new task key for one second simulates pressing the menu key.

Camera 
The S5 includes a 16 megapixel (5312×2988) rear-facing camera, which offers 4K (2160p) video recording at 30 fps, phase detection autofocus (which Samsung claims to be able to focus in around 0.3 seconds), real-time HDR photos and video (of which the latter is available for the first time in a Samsung flagship mobile device), and an image sensor with Samsung's "Isocell" technology, which isolates the individual pixels inside the sensor to improve its ability to capture light and reduce crosstalk. The model number of the image sensor is S5K2P2XX. Compared to conventional BSI sensors, this reduces electrical crosstalk by about 30 percent.
The camera is also able to record 1080p@60fps for smoother real-time playback. It can also record slow-motion videos with 720p at 120fps, but only encoded using the menial method.

The front camera uses a Samsung CMOS S5K8B1YX03 image sensor, an aperture of 2.4 and captures both photos and videos at 1080p; the latter at 30 frames per second.

Related section: Camera and gallery software.

Miscellaneous 
Next to the camera's flash on the rear of the device is a new heart rate sensor, which can be used as part of the S Health software.

The top of the device has an IR blaster and headphone jack. The IR blaster is a transmitter only and it has a built-in database of devices that can be controlled by Samsung's Smart Remote application.

The Galaxy S5 lacks the thermometer (temperature) and hygrometer (humidity) sensors that both 2013's flagships, the Galaxy S4 and Galaxy Note 3 were equipped with.

Internal specifications 
The S5 is powered by a 2.5 GHz quad-core Snapdragon 801 system-on-chip with 2 GB of RAM. Although not mentioned during the keynote presentation, a variant (SM-G900H) with an octa-core Exynos 5422 system-on-chip was also released in multiple markets. Like the previous model, it uses two clusters of four cores; four Cortex-A15 cores at 2.1 GHz, and four Cortex-A7 cores at 1.5 GHz. Depending on resource usage, the SoC can use the power-efficient A7 cores for lighter processing loads, and switch to the A15 cores for more demanding loads. Unlike previous iterations, however, the Exynos 5422 can run both sets of cores at the same time instead of only one at a time.

Battery 
The S5 contains a 2800 mAh lithium ion battery, which is user-replaceable despite IP67 water resistance. It is Qi compatible (requires an optional Wireless Charging Cover) and also contains an "Ultra Power Saving" mode to extend further battery life; when enabled, all non-essential processes are disabled, and the screen switches to grey scale rendering. Samsung claims that with Ultra Power Saving on, an S5 with 10% charge remaining can last for an additional 24 hours in standby mode. Another improvement in power efficiency comes from the use of Qualcomm's envelope tracker, which reduces the power used in connectivity.

Software 
The S5 shipped with Android 4.4.2 KitKat but has received updates, the most recent being 6.0.1 Marshmallow. It has Samsung's TouchWiz software, which for the S5 has a flatter, more geometric look than that found on the S4. Certain aspects of the changes were influenced by a recent patent licensing deal with Google, which requires that Samsung's TouchWiz interface follow the design of "stock" Android more closely. The S5 adds the Galaxy Note 3's "My Magazine" feature to the leftmost page on the home screen, the Settings menu was updated with a new grid-based layout, a Kids' Mode was added, while the S Health app was given expanded functionality, integrating with the new heart rate sensor on the device, along with the new Gear 2 smartwatch and Gear Fit activity tracker. The "Download Booster" tool allows internet usage to be split across LTE and Wi-Fi to improve download speed. Due to carrier policies, Download Booster was not available on Galaxy S5 models released in the United States running KitKat 4.4.2, excluding T-Mobile US and U.S. Cellular. The precluded telephone application is equipped with additional options for noise cancellation, call holding, volume boosting and the ability to personalize the call sound. A disk space analyzer tool is included.

The Galaxy S5 inherits the interaction functionality of the Galaxy S4, such as finger Air View, air gesture and motion gesture controls, and Samsung SmartScreen.
For Air View, a self-capacitive touch screen layer is used to detect the floating finger. The "Quick Glance" feature from the Galaxy S4 was succeeded by "Air wake-up", where hovering above the front proximity sensor next to the "Samsung" wordmark wakes the phone up from stand-by mode rather than just showing the clock and status.

Security 
The S5 contains a number of new security features. The fingerprint reader can be used to unlock the phone, while an SDK is available so third-party developers may offer fingerprint-oriented functionality in their apps; for example, PayPal integrated support for the fingerprint sensor to authenticate online purchases. The S5 also adds "Private Mode", which allows users to maintain hidden apps and file folders that cannot be accessed without additional authentication.

Camera and gallery software 
The camera app was updated with a new "Shot & More" menu that captures eight still photos in quick succession stored into a single JPG file, allowing users to make edits to photos after they are taken using Samsung's gallery software. It incorporates camera features from earlier Samsung phones (Best Photo, Best Face, Drama Shot, Eraser and Action panorama) into a single camera mode. The camera software is also equipped with a new selective focus mode that captures multiple photos at different focus settings (also known as focus bracketing, albeit being stored in a single file), allowing the user to choose the desired focus setting (near focus, far focus, pan focus) any time after capture, and allows users to export the photo at the desired focus settings into a separate file.

Additional camera modes are downloadable from a store provided by Samsung.

The camera software is equipped with a remote viewfinder feature, which allows using the display of one unit as the viewfinder of a second phone paired through Wi-Fi Direct. Next to the S5, only the Galaxy S4, Galaxy S4 Zoom, Galaxy K Zoom, Galaxy Note 3 and Galaxy Alpha are equipped with this functionality.

Two new features, Virtual Tour and Spherical (360°) Panorama have been added, respectively allowing to capture photos stitched together to a navigable 3D environment and to a spherical view of the surroundings, both inside the precluded gallery software. 360-degree panoramas are navigable with both touch and gyroscope sensor (device movement).

The camera setting shortcuts on the left (horizontal) side of the screen are customizable, allowing the user to select four shortcuts to more frequently accessed camera settings.

The camera software has been criticized for over-sharpening photos in post processing.

The gallery software is able to show Exif meta data of pictures such as exposure time, exposure value, light sensitivity (ISO), aperture, focal length, flash status and a histogram.

Updates 
An update to Android 5.0 "Lollipop" was first released for S5 models in Poland in December 2014. The update incorporates performance improvements, an updated "Recent apps" view that utilizes a card-based layout, access to notifications on the lock screen, and modifications to the TouchWiz interface to adhere to Material design language. In April 2016, Samsung released an update to Android 6.0.1 "Marshmallow" for international S5 models. It enables new features such as "Google Now on Tap", which allows users to perform searches within the context of information currently being displayed on-screen, and "Doze", which optimizes battery usage when the device is not being physically handled.

Using a custom ROM such as LineageOS, Android 13 can be installed on Samsung Galaxy S5 devices.

Variants

Rugged variants 
Samsung released two rugged versions of the S5, the S5 Active and S5 Sport. Both models feature a version of the S5's design with a full set of physical navigation buttons and do not include the fingerprint scanner, but are otherwise identical to standard models of the S5. Both devices also include an exclusive "Activity Zone" app, which contains a barometer, compass, and stopwatch. The S5 Active adds an "Active Key" to the side of the device, which can be configured to launch certain apps on short and long presses; by default, the button launches Activity Zone. The Sprint S5 Sport has additional Sprint Fit Live software, which acts as a hub for health-oriented content and S Health, along with the Under Armour-owned MapMyFitness MVP service and the music streaming service Spotify—the device comes with complimentary subscriptions to both services. The S5 Active and S5 Sport were released in the United States in June 2014, and are exclusive to AT&T and Sprint respectively. The S5 Active was released in Canada in October 2014.

In June 2014, Samsung also released a dual SIM version of the Galaxy S5, called Samsung Galaxy S5 Duos, model SM-G900FD. The Duos has the LTE specification of the Galaxy S5.

Neo variant 
A hardware revision called the Galaxy S5 Neo was quietly released in August 2015.

The S5 Neo is a lower cost variant of the original Galaxy S5 that downgrades the SoC to an Exynos 7580 Octa system-on-chip, while improving the front camera to a 5-megapixel unit. Other changes include the removal of a fingerprint sensor and a conventional USB 2.0 port in lieu of a USB 3.0 port with a water-resistant cover, the latter of which had been a source of complaints from users who found the cover was easily broken from regular use, compared to the previous year's model. A noticeable design distinction is the finer dot pattern on the removable rear cover. Samsung also released Android 7.0 Nougat with Samsung Experience which the original S5 did not have. The S5 Neo was initially made available in Europe (SM-G903F) and Canada (SM-G903W).

While the original Galaxy S5 is able to record videos at 2160p at 30fps, 1080p at 60fps and 720p at 120fps, the camera of the Galaxy S5 Neo can only record videos at 1080p at up to 30fps and lacks slow motion video recording entirely.

The Galaxy S5 Neo lacks wireless charging support entirely and can not be retrofitted with a wireless charging back cover.

Comparison table

Reception

Critical reception 
The S5 received mostly positive reviews; critics acknowledged that the S5 was primarily a technological evolution of its predecessor with few changes of significance. Although praised for an improved appearance and build quality, the design of the S5 was panned for retaining a nearly identical appearance and construction to the S4, and for not using higher quality materials such as metal or a higher-quality plastic. The display of the S5 was praised for having a high quality, not being as oversaturated as previous models, and having a wide range of viewing angles, brightness states, and gamut settings to fine tune its appearance. TechRadar also noticed that, despite the high power of its processor, some apps and interface functions suffered from performance issues, indicating that the S5's operating system may not have been completely optimized for its system-on-chip. The S5's interface was praised for having a cleaner appearance than previous iterations—however, it was still criticized for containing too many unnecessary features and settings.

The S5's camera received mostly positive reviews for the improvements to image quality provided by its Isocell image sensor, but was deemed to still be not as good as its competitors, particularly in the case of low-light images. While the S5's camera interface was praised for having a streamlined design, it was criticized for taking too long to load, and the Selective Focus features were panned for being inconsistent in quality. While praised for providing more uses than the Touch ID function on the iPhone 5s, the fingerprint sensor was panned for requiring an unnatural vertical swiping gesture, having inconsistent and unforgiving results, and for being inconvenient in comparison to a password or PIN in most use cases due to these shortcomings. The Berlin-based Security Research Labs found that because the S5's fingerprint sensor could easily be spoofed, allows unlimited chances and does not require a PIN after 48 hours of inactivity or on startup like Touch ID, and can be used for more than just unlocking the phone, it "gives a would-be attacked an even greater incentive to learn the simple skill of spoofing fingerprints." Engadget considered the heart rate sensor to be similarly unforgiving and sometimes being inaccurate in comparison to other heart rate trackers, while The Verge felt that it was a redundant addition due to the concurrent introduction of the Samsung Gear Fit, which includes a heart rate tracker of its own, and is likely to also be purchased by those wanting to take full advantage of the S Health software on their S5.

Sales 
The S5 shipped to retailers 10 million units in 25 days, making it the fastest shipping smartphone in Samsung's history. Samsung shipped 11 million units of the S5 during its first month of availability, exceeding shipped units of the S4 in the same period by 1 million units. However, 12 million units of the S5 were shipped in its first three months of availability, which is lower than the S4's sales.

Due to the lower sales of the S5, in July 2014, Samsung reported its lowest profits in over two years, and a drop in market share from 32.3% to 25.2% over the past year. The loss in market share was attributed primarily to growing pressure from competitors – especially in the growing low-end smartphone market, and an already saturated market for high-end smartphones. By the end of 2014, it was reported that sales of the S5 were 40% down on the previous S4 model, prompting management changes at Samsung.

See also 

 Comparison of Samsung Galaxy S smartphones
 Comparison of smartphones
 Samsung Galaxy S series
 Samsung Rugby Smart
 Samsung Galaxy 5, a similarly-named smartphone from 2010
 Samsung Galaxy Note 5, another similarly-named smartphone from 2015

Notes

References

External links 
 

Android (operating system) devices
Discontinued flagship smartphones
Samsung smartphones
Samsung Galaxy
Mobile phones introduced in 2014
Mobile phones with user-replaceable battery
Mobile phones with infrared transmitter
Mobile phones with self-capacitive touch screen layer
Mobile phones with 4K video recording
Discontinued smartphones